Bajraku, meaning "Flag" in Albanian, also known as Oštro koplje (which means "Sharp Spear" in Serbian, is the highest mountain peak in the southern Kopaonik mountains in Kosovo. At 1789m high it is the second highest mountain in the Kosovan part of Kopaonik. Because of its height the mountain and its surroundings are treeless. To the south of the mountain are the large villages of Kaçandoll and Bajgora.

References

Kopaonik
Mountains of Kosovo